The Belgium national futsal team is the national futsal team of Belgium and is controlled by the Belgian Football Association and represents the country in international futsal competitions, such as the FIFA Futsal World Cup and the European Championships.

Tournament records

FIFA Futsal World Cup

UEFA European Futsal Championship

Grand Prix de Futsal

Futsal Mundialito

Players

Current squad
The following players were called up to the squad for the UEFA 2024 FIFA Futsal World Cup qualification matches against Austria and Georgia on 5 and 8 October 2022, respectively.
Head coach: Karim Bachar

Notable players
 Leonardo Aleixo
 Rafael Teixeira
 Liliu
 Lúcio
 Zico
 André

References

External links
 Belgian Football.be website - Belgian FA official website

 
Belgium
national